The Beans and Bacon mine is a disused lead mine on Bonsall Moor near the village of Bonsall, Derbyshire, United Kingdom.  The nearest large town is Matlock.  The mine was in operation from 1920 to 1925, but workings around the mine date back to at least 1740 and some are thought to be medieval, making it of some archaeological importance. No reason has been given for the mine's unusual name, but other mines in the area are called Mule Spinner, Frogs Hole, Cackle Mackle and Wanton Legs, so this mine's name is not atypical.

The mine is one of a group in the area scheduled under the Ancient Monuments and Archaeological Areas Act 1979 as an ancient monument of national importance. The site is one of only two that show numerous different methods of rock breakage on such a small site. These methods include plug and feather, gad and wedge, and gunpowder blasting.

In September 2014 a cow was rescued from the Beans and Bacon mine after falling  down a shaft.  Rescuers enlarged another entrance and coaxed the animal out.

References

History of Derbyshire
Mining in Derbyshire
Peak District
History of mining in the United Kingdom
Archaeological sites in Derbyshire
Lead mines in England
Former mines in England
Underground mines in England